Eucithara grata is a small sea snail, a marine gastropod mollusk in the family Mangeliidae.

According to Kilburn (1992) this species is very doubtfully referred to the genus Eucithara.

Description
The length of the shell attains 6.7 mm, its diameter 2.8 mm.

Distribution

References

 Dautzenberg P. 1932. Mollusques testacés marins de Madagascar. Supplement.J. Conchyliol. 76(1); 4-119, pI. 1.

External links
  Tucker, J.K. 2004 Catalog of recent and fossil turrids (Mollusca: Gastropoda). Zootaxa 682:1-1295.

grata
Gastropods described in 1884